Crosshairs is a supplement published by West End Games in 1993 for the dystopian science fiction role-playing game Shatterzone.

Contents
Crosshairs is a 64-page softcover sourcebook by Shane Hensley, with illustrations by Jamie Lombardo, Ron Hill, and Karl Waller, with cover art by Stephen Crane. The book details the planet Texaiter, where mining is the main activity, home to industrial waste and corporate corruption, and includes random encounters with notable residents.

Reception
In the March 1994 edition of Dragon (Issue #203), Rick Swan was complimentary, giving it a rating of 3.5 stars out of 6 and saying, "Of the first batch of [Shatterzone] supplements, Crosshairs is the stand-out."

Reviews
White Wolf Magazine (Issue 40 - Jan 1994)

References

Role-playing game supplements introduced in 1993
Science fiction role-playing game supplements
Shatterzone